Fernhill School is a coeducational secondary school located in Farnborough in the English county of Hampshire.

It is a community school administered by Hampshire County Council. The school previously held specialist status as a Language College and was known as Fernhill School & Language College. In April 2016 the school changed its name to simply 'Fernhill School' due to the ending of the specialist schools programme.

In 2017 the school had two fires, which had 3 fatalities, one of which the main hall was destroyed and the other fire did major damage to the A-Block boys toilets. In 2018 any damage had been repaired with the school getting a modern main hall.

In 2022, the school had been rated inadequate after inspectors found homophobic bullying "occurred frequently". The inspectors also said pupils' behaviour often disrupted lessons and safeguarding measures were ineffective.

References

External links
 Official Fernhill School website

Secondary schools in Hampshire
Community schools in Hampshire